Lugbara, or Lugbarati, is the language of the Lugbara people. It is spoken in the West Nile region in northwestern Uganda, as well as the Democratic Republic of the Congo's Orientale Province.

Classification and dialects
The Aringa language, also known as Low Lugbara, is closely related, and sometimes considered a dialect of Lugbara. If fact, among the Lugbara of Uganda, it is one of the five clans (Ayivu clan, Vurra clan, Terego clan, Maracha clan, and Aringa clan). Some scholars classify the Lugbara language itself as a dialect of the Ma'di language, though this is not generally accepted. An SIL survey report concluded that the Okollo, Ogoko, and Rigbo dialects, called "Southern Ma'di", should be classified as dialects of Lugbara.

Phonology

Vowels 

 /ɛ, ɔ/ can also be heard as [e, o] as a result of vowel harmony.
 /a/ can have an allophone of [ʌ] when after sounds /k, ɡ/.

Consonants 

 /l/ can be heard as a lateral flap  within dialectal variation.
 /t͡s, d͡z/ are heard as [t͡ʃ, d͡ʒ] within dialectal variation.
 /tʳ, dʳ/ can also be heard as retroflex [ʈɽ, ɖɽ] within free variation.
 /ʔj/ can also be heard as an implosive  and /ⁿz/ can be heard as [ⁿd͡z], within free variation.
 A labial affricate  may occur within dialectal variation,  only rarely occurs among different dialects.

Orthography
Lugbara was first written by Christian missionaries in 1918, based on the Ayivu dialect. In 2000, a conference was held in the city of Arua in northwestern Uganda regarding the creation of a standardised international orthography for Lugbara.

In education
In 1992, the Government of Uganda designated it as one of five "languages of wider communication" to be used as the medium of instruction in primary education; however, unlike the other four such languages, it was never actually used in schools. More recently it was included in the curriculum for some secondary schools in the West Nile region, including St. Joseph's College Ombaci and Muni Girls Secondary School, both in Arua District.

Pronunciation guide
Lugbara phrases are spoken in several dialects (clan-wise) but the Muni (Ayivu) version, from which many of the explanations below are based, is the one approved for teaching in schools. The language has diphthong clusters and other noteworthy phonetics including the following:

aa as in bat, for example 

c as in church, for example  (which is also spelt Chandiru)

dj as in jilt, for example , the ‘d’ is silent

ee as in emblem, for example 

gb as in bend, for example gbe, the ‘g’ is silent. Gb in Lugbara does not have an equivalent in English. What stands out in these Sudanic languages is the special manner in which 'kp, gb, 'd, 'b, 'y, 'w are pronounced.

i as in inn, for example di-i

oa as in oar, for example 

oo as in old, for example , less often oo as in food, for example ‘doo

uu as in chew, for example cuu

z as in jean after n, for example onzi. Otherwise, most times remains z as in zebra, for example Ozu and when the first letter of a word.

Vocabulary
The Lugbara alphabet has 28 letters minus ‘q’ and ‘x’ (Alamakanda in Aringa language), which means 24 like in English and four unique ones namely: ‘b like in ‘bua, ‘d like in ‘dia, ‘w like in ‘wara and ‘y like in ‘. Letters are pronounced as follows: Ah, Ba, Cha, Da, Eh, Fa, Ga, Ha, Ie, Ja, Ka, La, Ma, Na, Oh, Pa, Ra, Sa, Ta, Uuw, Va, Wa, Ya, and Za.

Some words are borrowed from other languages, for example safari (journey) from Swahili, buku (book) from English, and kandi (ball) from Lingala. Also in the vocabulary, there are several words that have varied meanings when pronounced differently, for instance oli can mean air, wind (also oliriko), whistle, cut or roll.

Numbers

Greetings and other phrases

Relationships
Grandfather (a’bi,a'bipi)

Grandmother (dede, e’di,e'dapi)

Grandson (mvia)

Granddaughter (zia)

Father (ati, ata)

Mother (andri, andre, ayia)

Husband (agupi)

Wife (oku)

Son (agupiamva, mvi)

Daughter (zamva, zi)

Brother

Sister

Uncles (atapuru (singular -paternal) atapuruka (plural - paternal), [maternal -  (singular), maternal (plural) - ]

Aunts ( - plural: paternal and in some cases maternal), (: singular),  - (singular: maternal aunt),  - (plural: maternal aunts)

Cousin

Cousin brother; also 

Cousin sister; also 

NB: Strictly speaking, the word cousin is alien in Lugbara culture. Cousins are brothers and sisters.

Nephews (adro anzi) - maternal nephews

Nieces (adro ezoanzi, ezaapi) - maternal nieces

Father-in-law (anya)

Mother-in-law (edra)

Brother-in-law (otuo)

Sister-in-law (onyere)

Days of the week
1 week (Sabatu alu, sabiti alu)

A day is called O’du in Lugbara.

Sunday

Monday (O’du alu)

Tuesday (O’du iri)

Wednesday (O’du na)

Thursday (O’du su)

Friday (O’du towi)

Saturday (O’du azia)

Calendar
The simplest way to refer to months (Mba in Lugbara) is to use numbers, for example January is Mba Alu, February is Mba Iri, May is Mba Towi and so on. But below is the other Latinized (and seasonal) way of mentioning them.

Januari (Oco ‘dupa sere)

Feburili (Kulini)

Marici (Zengulu)

Aprili (Ayi – Wet season)

Mayi (Mayi)

Juni (Emveki)

Julayi (Irri)

Agoslo (Iripaku)

Sebitemba (Lokopere)

Okitoba (Abibi)

Novemba (Waa)

Desemba (Anyu fi kuma)

Common signs

Colours
Eka (Ika by Terego) (red)

 (white)

 (very pure white)

Ini (black)

Inibiricici, inicici, inikukuru (very dark)

Emvesi-enisi (black and white)

Foro [foro] (gray)

Foroto (grayish)

Food

Learning more
To study Lugbara, you might need a language teacher or guide but knowing the pronunciation basics and vocabulary preferably from a dictionary can give you a very good start. Practice by talking to natives physically or online and listening to Lugbara music.

See also 
 Agofe
 Districts of Uganda
 Lugbara music
 Lugbara proverbs

References

Further reading 
 

Lugbara
Moru-Madi languages
Languages of Uganda
Languages of the Democratic Republic of the Congo